Kam Mueang or Northern Thai language is the language of the Northern Thai people of Lanna, Thailand. It is a Southwestern Tai language that is closely related to Lao. Kam Mueang has approximately six million speakers, most of whom live in the native Northern Thailand, with a smaller community of Lanna speakers in northwestern Laos.

Speakers of this language generally consider the name "Tai Yuan" to be pejorative.

The term Yuan is still sometimes used for Northern Thai's distinctive Tai Tham alphabet, which is closely related to the old Tai Lue alphabet and the Lao religious alphabets. There is no active production of literature in the traditional alphabet, and when used in writing standard Thai script is invariably used. The modern spoken form is called . There is a resurgence of interest in writing it in the traditional way, but the modern pronunciation differs from that prescribed in spelling rules.

Classification 

Northern Thai is classified as one of the Chiang Saen languages—others being Thai, Southern Thai and numerous smaller languages, which together with the Northwestern Tai and Lao-Phutai languages, form the Southwestern branch of Tai languages. The Tai languages are a branch of the Kra–Dai language family, which encompasses a large number of indigenous languages spoken in an arc from Hainan and Guangxi south through Laos and Northern Vietnam to the Cambodian border.

From a purely genealogical standpoint, most linguists consider Northern Thai to be more closely related to Central Thai than to Lao or Isan, but the language has been heavily influenced by both Lao and Central Thai throughout history. All Southwestern Tai languages form a coherent dialect continuum of more or less mutually intelligible varieties, with few sharp dividing lines. Nevertheless, Northern Thai has today become closer to the Central Thai language, as Standard Thai is the principal language of education and government and spoken throughout Thailand.

Names 
The Northern Thai language has various names in Northern Thai, Thai, and other Tai languages. 
 In Northern Thai, it is commonly called  (literally "city language"; cf.
 In Central Thai and Southern Thai, Northern Thai is known as phasa thin phayap (ภาษาถิ่นพายัพ , literally "the language of the northwestern region"), or phasa thai thin nuea (ภาษาไทยถิ่นเหนือ , literally "the Thai language of the northern region", or colloquially it is known as phasa nuea (ภาษาเหนือ , literally "the northern language"). 
 In Tai Lü, it is known as kam yon (literally "the Tai Yuan language"). 
 In Shan it is known as kwam yon (literally "the Tai Yuan language").

History

Tai migration 

The ancestors of the Northern Thai people were speakers of Southwestern Tai dialects that migrated from what is now southeastern China, specifically what is now Guangxi and northern Vietnam where the diversity of various Tai languages suggests an Urheimat. The Southwestern Tai languages began to diverge from the Northern and Central branches of the Tai languages, covered mainly by various Zhuang languages, sometime around 112 AD, but likely completed by the sixth century. Due to the influx of Han Chinese soldiers and settlers, the end of the Chinese occupation of Vietnam, the fall of Jiaozhi and turbulence associated with the decline and fall of the Tang dynasty led some of the Tai peoples speaking Southwestern Tai to flee into Southeast Asia, with the small-scale migration mainly taking place between the eighth and twelfth centuries. The Tais split and followed the major river courses, with the ancestral Northern Thai originating in the Tai migrants that followed the Mekong River.

Indianized kingdoms 
Ancestors of the Northern Thai people established Ngoenyang, an early kingdom that existed between the 7th to 13th centuries, as well as smaller kingdoms like Phayao, in what is now modern-day northern Thailand. They settled in areas adjacent to the kingdom of Hariphunchai, coming into contact with Mon-speaking people whose writing system was eventually adapted for the Northern Thai language as the Tai Tham script. In the 13th century, King Mangrai consolidated control of these territories, establishing the kingdom of Lan Na. In the 15th century, King Tilokkarat ushered in a golden age for Northern Thai literature, with a profusion of palm leaf manuscripts written in Tai Tham, using vernacular Northern Thai and interspersed with Pali and Buddhist Indic vocabulary.

Thai subordination 
In 1775, Kawila of Lampang revolted with Siamese assistance, and captured the city, ending 200 years of Burmese rule. Kawila was installed as the prince of Lampang and Phraya Chaban as the prince of Chiang Mai, both as vassals of Siam. In 1899, Siam annexed the Northern Thai principalities, effectively dissolving their status as sovereign tributary states.

The Compulsory Education Act of 1921 banned schools and temples from using languages other than Central Thai (standard Thai), in an effort to bring remote regions under Siamese control. Northern Thai was relegated from the public sphere, with influential religious leaders like Khruba Srivichai jailed for using Northern Thai in sermons. In the 1940s, authorities promulgated Thai cultural mandates that reinforced the importance of learning and using Central Thai as the prestige language.

These economic and educational pressures have increased the use of standard Thai to the detriment of other regional languages like Northern Thai. Today, Northern Thai is typically code-switched with standard Thai, especially in more developed and urbanized areas of Northern Thailand, whereas exclusive use of Northern Thai remains prevalent in more remote areas.

Dialects 
Thanajirawat (2018) classifies Tai Yuan into five major dialect groups based on tonal split and merger patterns. (See also Proto-Tai language#Tones)

most Tai Yuan varieties in Thailand, Laos and Myanmar
Bokeo Province, Laos (A12-34 and BCD123-4 (B4=DL4=DS4))
Mae Chaem District, Chiang Mai Province and Laplae District, Uttaradit Province, Thailand (A12-34 and BCD123-4 (A34=B123=DL123))
Tha Pla District, Uttaradit Province and Xayaburi Province, Laos (A12-34, BDL1234, and CDS123-4)
Ratchaburi Province, Thailand (A12-34 and BCD123-4 (A34=B123=DL123, B4=C4=DL4))

Phonology

Consonants

Initial consonants
Northern Thai consonant inventory is similar to that of Lao; both languages have the  sound and lack .

Initial consonant clusters
There are two relatively common consonant clusters:

/kw/  
/xw/    

There are also several other, less frequent clusters recorded, though apparently in the process of being lost:

/ŋw/  
/tɕw/  
/sw/  
/tw/  
/tʰw/  
/nw/ 
/ɲw/  
/jw/ 
/lw/    
/ʔw/

Final consonants 
All plosive sounds are unreleased.

Vowels
The basic vowels of the Northern Thai language are similar to those of Standard Thai. They, from front to back and close to open, are given in the following table. The top entry in every cell is the symbol from the International Phonetic Alphabet, the second entry gives the spelling in the Thai alphabet, where a dash (–) indicates the position of the initial consonant after which the vowel is pronounced. A second dash indicates that a final consonant must follow.

The vowels each exist in long-short pairs: these are distinct phonemes forming unrelated words in Northern Thai, but usually transliterated the same: เขา (khao) means "they/them", while ขาว (khao) means "white".

The long-short pairs are as follows:

The basic vowels can be combined into diphthongs.  For purposes of determining tone, those marked with an asterisk are sometimes classified as long:

Additionally, there are three triphthongs, For purposes of determining tone, those marked with an asterisk are sometimes classified as long:

Allophones
The following section largely concerns the Nan dialect of Northern Thai.

Tones

There are six phonemic tones in the Chiang Mai dialect of Northern Thai: low-rising, low-falling, high-level with glottal closure, mid-level, high-falling, and high-rising. or low-rising, mid-low, high-falling, mid-high, falling, and high rising-falling

Contrastive tones in smooth syllables 
The table below presents six phonemic tones in the Chiang Mai and Nan dialects in smooth syllables, i.e. closed syllables ending in sonorant sounds such as [m], [n], [ŋ], [w], and [j] and open syllables. Sources have not agreed on the phonetic realization of the six tones in the Chiang Mai dialect. The table presents information based on two sources, one from Gedney (1999) and the other one from the Lanna dictionary (2007) which is a Northern Thai-Thai dictionary. Although published in 1999, Gedney's information about the Chiang Mai dialect is based on data he collected from one speaker in Chiang Mai in 1964 (p. 725). As tones may change within one's lifetime (e.g., Bangkok Thai tones have changed over the past 100 years), the information about the six tones from Gedney (1999) should be considered with caution.

The Gedney boxes for the tones are shown below the descriptions.

Contrastive tones in checked syllables 
The table below presents four phonemic tones in checked syllables, i.e. closed syllables ending in a glottal stop [ʔ] and obstruent sounds such as [p], [t], and [k].

Grammar
The grammar of Northern Thai is similar to those of other Tai languages. The word order is subject–verb–object, although the subject is often omitted. Just as Standard Thai, Northern Thai pronouns are selected according to the gender and relative status of speaker and audience.

Adjectives and adverbs
There is no morphological distinction between adverbs and adjectives. Many words can be used in either function. They succeed the word which they modify, which may be a noun, verb, or another adjective or adverb. 
 / แม่ญิงเฒ่า an old woman
 / แม่ญิงตี้เฒ่าโวย a woman who became old quickly

Because adjectives can be used as complete predicates, many words used to indicate tense in verbs (see Verbs:Aspect below) may be used to describe adjectives.
 / ข้าหิว I am hungry.
 / ข้าจะหิว I will be hungry.
 / ข้ากะลังหิว I am hungry right now.
 / ข้าหิวแล้ว I am already hungry.

Verbs
Verbs do not inflect. They do not change with person, tense, voice, mood, or number; nor are there any participles.
  / ข้าตี๋เปิ้น, I hit him.
  / เปิ้นตี๋ข้า, He hit me.
The passive voice is indicated by the insertion of  / โดน before the verb. For example:
  / เปิ้นโดนตี๋, He is hit or He got hit. This describes an action that is out of the receiver's control and, thus, conveys suffering.

To convey the opposite sense, a sense of having an opportunity arrive,  / ได้ (dai, can) is used. For example:
  / เปิ้นจะได้ไปแอ่วเมืองลาว, He gets to visit Laos.
  / เปิ้นตี๋ได้, He is/was allowed to hit or He is/was able to hit

Negation is indicated by placing บ่ (bor,  or  not) before the verb.
  / เปิ้นบ่ตี๋, He is not hitting. or He not hit.

Aspect is conveyed by aspect markers before or after the verb.
Present can be indicated by  / กะลัง (currently) or  / กะลังหะ (currently) before the verb for ongoing action (like English -ing form), by  / อยู่ after the verb, or by both. For example:
  / เปิ้นกะลังหะล่น, or
  / เปิ้นล่นอยู่, or
  / เปิ้นกะลังหะล่นอยู่, He is running.

Future can be indicated by  / จะ (cha, will) before the verb or by a time expression indicating the future. For example:
  / เปิ้นจะล่น, He will run or He is going to run.

Past can be indicated by  / ได้ (dai) before the verb or by a time expression indicating the past. However,  / แล้ว (laew,  :, already) is often used to indicate the past aspect by being placed behind the verb. Or, both ได้ and แล้ว are put together to form the past aspect expression. For example:
  / เปิ้นได้กิ๋น, He ate.
  / เปิ้นกิ๋นแล้ว (He has eaten.
  / เปิ้นได้กิ๋นแล้ว, He's already eaten.
Aspect markers are not required.
  / ข้ากิ๋นตี้หั้น, I eat there.
  / ข้ากิ๋นตี้หั้นตะวา, I ate there yesterday.
  / ข้ากิ๋นตี้หั้นวันพูก, I'll eat there tomorrow.

Words that indicate obligation include at cha ( / อาจจะ), na cha ( / น่าจะ), khuan cha ( / ควรจะ), and tong ( / ต้อง).
 ( / อาจจะ) Might
  / เปิ้นอาจจะมา He might come.
 ( / น่าจะ) Likely to
  / เปิ้นน่าจะมา He is likely to come.
 ( / ควรจะ) Should
  / เปิ้นควรจะมา He should come.
 ( / ต้อง) Must
  / เปิ้นต้องมา He must come.

Actions that wherein one is busily engaged can be indicated by มัวก่า (mua ka).
  / ก่อมัวก่ากิ๋นหั้นเนาะ (kor mua ka kin han nor) (It's that you/he/she) just keeps on eating it like that, you know?

Words that express one's desire to do something can by indicated by khai (ใค่) and kan (กั๊น).
 ( / ใค่, to want, to desire)
  / ข้าเจ้าใค่กิ๋น I want to eat.
 ( / กั๊น, to try)
  / ข้าเจ้ากั๊นกิ๋น I try to eat.

 ( / ผ่อท่าว่า) is used to give the impression or sensation of being something or having a particular quality. 
  / ผ่อท่าว่าเปิ้นปิ๊กมาแล้ว It seems that he has returned.

Final particles 
Northern Thai has a number of final particles, which have different functions.

Interrogative particles 
 ( / ก่อ, denoting yes/no question)
  / ม่วนก่อ Is it fun?
 ( / กา (and its variants: ก๋า, กา), denoting confirmative question) 
  / ม่วนกา It is fun, right?

Imperative particles 

 ( / แล่)
  / กิ๋นแล่ Eat! (Authoritative).
 ( / จิ่ม)
  / ขอกิ๋นจิ่ม May I eat please?
 ( / เหีย)
  / กิ๋นเหีย Eat! (because I know it will be beneficial to you).
 (ᩡ / เต๊อะ)
  / กิ๋นเต๊อะ Eat, please.

Polite particles 
 ( / คับ, used by males)
  / กิ๋นเข้าแล้วคับ I have eaten, sir/ma'am.
 ( / เจ้า, used by females)
  / กิ๋นเข้าแล้วเจ้า I have eaten, sir/ma'am.

Nouns
Nouns are uninflected and have no gender; there are no articles.

Nouns are neither singular nor plural. Some specific nouns are reduplicated to form collectives:  / ละอ่อน (child) is often repeated as  ละอ่อน ๆ to refer to a group of children.

The word  / หมู่() may be used as a prefix of a noun or pronoun as a collective to pluralize or emphasise the following word.

Plurals are expressed by adding classifiers, used as measure words (ลักษณนาม), in the form of noun-number-classifier (  / คูห้าคน, "teacher five person" for "five teachers").

Pronouns
Pronouns may be omitted once they have already been established in the first sentence, unless the pronoun in the following sentences is different from the first sentence. The pronoun "you" may also be omitted if the speaker is speaking directly to a second person. Moreover, names may replace pronouns, and they can even replace the first person singular pronoun.

Vocabulary
Northern Thai shares much vocabulary with Standard Thai, especially scientific terms, which draw many prefixes and suffixes from Sanskrit and Pali, and it also has its own distinctive words. Just like Thai and Lao, Northern Thai has borrowed many loanwords from Khmer, Sanskrit, and Pali.

Writing system 

Currently, different scripts are used to write Northern Thai. However, native speakers are presently illiterate in the traditional script; therefore, they instead use the Thai script to write the language. In Laos, the Lao script is commonly used to write Northern Thai.

Some problems arise when the Thai script is used to write Northern Thai. In particular, Standard Thai script cannot transcribe all Northern Thai tones. The two falling tones in Northern Thai correspond to a single falling tone in Thai. Specifically, Northern Thai has two types of falling tones: high-falling tone and falling tone. However, Thai lacks the distinction between the two falling tones, not having a high-falling tone. When using Thai script to write Northern Thai tones, the distinction of the two falling tones is lost because Thai script can only indicate a low falling tone. Consequently, the meaning of ก้า is ambiguous as it can mean both "to be brave" and "value". As a result, the spelling ป้าย is ambiguous because it can mean both "sign" or "to lose". Such tonal mergence ambiguity is avoided when the language is written with the Northern Thai script.

Northern Thai and Standard Thai
The tables below present the differences between Northern Thai and Standard Thai.

Different sounds
Unlike Northern Thai, Standard Thai lacks palatal nasal sound (/ɲ/). Thus, the palatal nasal sound (/ɲ/) and the palatal approximant sound (/j/) in Northern Thai both correspond to the palatal approximant sound in Standard Thai:

Unlike Northern Thai, Standard Thai lacks a high-falling tone ([˥˧]). The high falling tone ([˥˧]) and falling tone ([˥˩]) in Northern Thai both correspond to the falling tone in Standard Thai ([˥˩]).

Different words
Many words differ from Standard Thai greatly:

Similar words
There is not a straightforward correspondence between the tones of Northern and Standard Thai.  It also depends on the initial consonant, as can be seen from the merged Gedney tone boxes for Standard Thai and the accent of Chiang Mai:

Note that the commonalities between columns are features of the Chiang Mai accent.  On the other hand, the relationships between rows are typical of Northern Thai, being found for at least for Chiang Mai, Chiang Rai, Phayao,

Nan and Prae, and extending at least to Tak and the old 6-tone accent of Tai Khuen, except that the checked syllables of Chiang Rai are more complicated.

The primary function of a tone box is etymological.  However, it also serves as a summary of the rules for tone indication when the writing system is essentially etymological in that regard, as is the case with the major Tai-language writing systems using the Thai, Lanna, New Tai Lue, Lao and Tai Dam scripts.

Some words differ only as a result of the regular tone correspondences:

Other tone differences are unpredictable, such as:

Some words differ in a single sound and associated tone. In many words, the initial ร (/r/) in Standard Thai corresponds to ฮ (/h/) in Northern Thai:

Aspiration of initial consonants 
Some aspirated consonants in the low-class consonant group (อักษรต่ำ /ʔàk.sɔ̌ːn.tàm/) in Standard Thai correspond to unaspirated sounds in Northern Thai.  These sounds include ค, ช, ท, and พ (/kʰ/, /t͡ɕʰ/, /tʰ/, and /pʰ/ respectively), but sounds such as ฅ, คร, ฆ, ฒ, พร, ภ (/kʰ/, /kʰr/, /kʰ/, /tʰ/, /pʰr/, and /pʰ/ respectively) remain aspirated. Such aspirated consonants that are unaspirated in Northern Thai correspond to unaspirated voiced sounds in Proto-Tai which are *ɡ, *ɟ, *d, and *b (ค, ช, ท, and พ respectively).:

But not:

Though a number of aspirated consonants in Standard Thai often correspond to unaspirated sounds in Northern Thai, when an unaspirated consonant is followed by ร (/r/) the unaspirated consonant becomes aspirated:

Notes

References

Further reading

 Bilmes, J. (1996). Problems And Resources In Analyzing Northern Thai Conversation For English Language Readers. Journal of Pragmatics, 26(2), 171–188.
 Davis, R. (1970). A Northern Thai reader. Bangkok: Siam Society.
 Filbeck, D. (1973). Pronouns in Northern Thai. Anthropological Linguistics, 15(8), 345–361.
 Herington, Jennifer, Margaret Potter, Amy Ryan and Jennifer Simmons (2013). Sociolinguistic Survey of Northern Thai. SIL Electronic Survey Reports.
 Howard, K. M. (2009). "When Meeting Khun Teacher, Each Time We Should Pay Respect": Standardizing Respect In A Northern Thai Classroom. Linguistics and Education, 20(3), 254–272.
 Khankasikam, K. (2012). Printed Lanna character recognition by using conway's game of life. In ICDIM (pp. 104–109).
 Pankhuenkhat, R. (1982). The Phonology of the Lanna Language:(a Northern Thai Dialect). Institute of Language and Culture for Rural Development, Mahidol University.
 Strecker, D. (1979). "A preliminary typology of tone shapes and tonal sound changes in Tai: the La-n N-a A-tones", in Studies in Tai and Mon-Khmer Phonetics and Phonology In Honour of Eugénie J.A. Henderson, ed. T.L. Thongkum et al., pp. 171–240. Chulalongkorn University Press.
 Wangsai, Piyawat. (2007). A Comparative Study of Phonological Yong and Northern Thai Language (Kammuang). M.A. thesis. Kasetsart University.

External links 
 Northern Thai New Testament. The New Testament in hard copy form was written using two scripts Amazon link.
Khamuang (Chiang Mai variety) (Intercontinental Dictionary Series)

 
Subject–verb–object languages
Stress-timed languages
Isolating languages
Languages of Thailand
Languages of Laos
Languages of Myanmar